The following highways are numbered 946:

United States